Melbourne Airport , colloquially known as Tullamarine Airport, is the primary airport serving the city of Melbourne, and the second busiest airport in Australia. It opened in 1970 to replace the nearby Essendon Airport. Melbourne Airport is the main international airport of the four airports serving the Melbourne metropolitan area, the other international airport being Avalon Airport.

The airport comprises four terminals: one international terminal, two domestic terminals and one budget domestic terminal. The airport has its own suburb and postcode—Melbourne Airport, Victoria (postcode 3045).

In 2016–17 around 25 million domestic passengers and 10 million international passengers used the airport. The airport features direct flights to 33 domestic destinations and to destinations in the Pacific, Europe, Asia, North America and South America. Melbourne Airport is the number one arrival/departure point for the airports of four of Australia's seven other capital cities. Melbourne serves as a major hub for Qantas and Virgin Australia, while Jetstar utilises the airport as home base. Domestically, Melbourne serves as headquarters for Australian airExpress and Toll Priority and handles more domestic freight than any other airport in the nation.

History

Establishment
Before the opening of Melbourne Airport, Melbourne's main airport was Essendon Airport, which was officially designated an international airport in 1950. In the mid-1950s, over 10,000 passengers were using Essendon Airport, and its limitations were beginning to become apparent. Essendon's facilities were insufficient to meet the increasing demand for air travel; the runways were too short to handle jets, and the terminals failed to handle the increase in passengers. By the mid-1950s, an international overflow terminal was built in a new northern hangar. The airport could not be expanded, as it had become surrounded by residential districts.

The search for a replacement for Essendon commenced in February 1958, when a panel was appointed to assess Melbourne's civil aviation needs. Alternative sites considered were Tullamarine (12 miles from Melbourne), Whittlesea (18 miles), Hastings (40 miles), Port Melbourne (3 miles), Werribee (25 miles), Laverton (16 miles), Avalon (35 miles) and Moorabbin (14 miles). Considerations such as superior proximity to Melbourne and lower development costs narrowed the choice to either Tullamarine or Laverton, with Laverton eventually eliminated in part due to issues coordinating both military and civil activities that could not guarantee the degree of safety demanded, and that traffic coordination would be easier with the shorter distance between Essendon and Tullamarine.

In 1959, the Commonwealth Government acquired  of grassland in then-rural Tullamarine.

In May 1959 it was announced that a new airport would be built at Tullamarine, with Prime Minister Robert Menzies announcing on 27 November 1962 a five-year plan to provide Melbourne with a A$45 million "jetport" by 1967. The first sod at Tullamarine was turned two years later in November 1964. In line with the five-year plan, the runways at Essendon were expanded to handle larger aircraft, with Ansett Australia launching the Boeing 727 there in October 1964, the first jet aircraft used for domestic air travel in Australia.

On 1 July 1970, Prime Minister John Gorton opened Melbourne Airport to international operations ending Essendon's near two decade run as Melbourne's international airport. Essendon still was home to domestic flights for one year, until they transferred to Melbourne Airport on 26 June 1971, with the first arrival of a Boeing 747 occurring later that year. In the first year of operations, Melbourne handled six international airlines and 155,275 international passengers.

Melbourne Airport was originally called 'Melbourne International Airport'. It is at Tullamarine, a name derived from the indigenous name Tullamareena. Locally, the airport is commonly referred to as Tullamarine or simply as Tulla to distinguish the airport from the other three Melbourne airports: Avalon, Essendon and Moorabbin.

On opening, Melbourne Airport consisted of three connected terminals: International in the centre, with Ansett to the South and Trans Australia Airlines to the North. The design capacity of the airport was eight Boeing 707s at a rate of 500 passengers per hour, with minor expansion works completed in 1973 allowing Boeing 747s to serve the airport. By the late 1980s peak passenger flows at the airport had reached 900 per hour, causing major congestion.

In late 1989, Federal Airports Corporation Inspector A. Rohead was put in charge of a bicentennial project to rename streets in Melbourne Airport to honour the original inhabitants, European pioneers and aviation history. Information on the first two categories was provided by Ian Hunter, Wurundjeri researcher, and Ray Gibb, local historian. The project was completed but was shelved, with the only suggested name, Gowrie Park Drive, being allocated, named after the farm at the heart of the airport. During the 1920s, the farm had been used as a landing site for aircraft, which were parked at night during World War II in case Essendon Aerodrome was bombed.

Expansion and privatisation

In 1988, the Australian Government formed the Federal Airports Corporation (FAC), placing Melbourne Airport under the operational control of the new corporation along with 21 other airports around the nation.

The FAC undertook a number of upgrades at the airport. The first major upgrades were carried out at the domestic terminals, with an expansion of the Ansett domestic terminal approved in 1989 and completed in 1991, adding a second pier for use by smaller regional airlines. Work on an upgrade of the international terminal commenced in 1991, with the 'SkyPlaza' retail complex completed in late 1993 on a site flanking the main international departure gates. The rest of the work was completed in 1995, when the new three-level satellite concourse was opened at the end of the existing concourse.

In April 1994, the Australian Government announced that all airports operated by FAC would be privatized in several phases. Melbourne Airport was included in the first phase, being acquired by the newly formed Australia Pacific Airports Corporation Limited for $1.3 billion. The transfer was completed on 30 June 1997 on a 50-year long-term lease, with the option for a further 49 years. Melbourne Airport is categorized as a Leased Commonwealth Airport.

Since privatization, further improvements to infrastructure have begun at the airport, including expansion of runways, car parks and terminals. The multi-storey carpark outside the terminal was completed between 1995 and August 1997 at a cost of $49 million, providing 3,100 parking spaces, the majority undercover. This initially four-level structure replaced the previous open air carpark outside the terminal. Work commenced on the six-story 276-room Hilton Hotel (now Parkroyal) above the carpark in January 1999, which was completed in mid-2000 at a cost of $55 million. Expansion of the Qantas domestic terminal was completed in 1999, featuring a second pier and 9 additional aircraft stands.

In December 2000, a fourth passenger terminal opened: the Domestic Express Terminal, located to the south of the main terminal building at a cost of $9 million. It was the first passenger terminal facility to be built at Melbourne Airport since 1971.

Expansion of carparks has also continued with a $40 million project commenced in 2004, doubling the size of the short term carpark with the addition of 2,500 spaces over six levels, along with 1,200 new spaces added to the 5,000 already available in the long term carpark. Revenue from retail operations at Melbourne Airport broke the $100 million mark for the first time in 2004, this being a 100 per cent increase in revenue since the first year of privatization.

In 2005, the airport undertook construction works to prepare the airport for the arrival of the double-decker Airbus A380. As a result, the airport was the first in Australia to be capable of handling the A380. The A380 made its first test flight into the airport on 14 November 2005. On 15 May 2008, the A380 made its first passenger flight into the airport when a Singapore Airlines Sydney-bound flight was diverted from Sydney Airport because of fog. Beginning services in October 2008, Qantas was the first airline to operate the A380 from the airport, flying nonstop to Los Angeles International Airport twice a week. This was the inaugural route for the Qantas A380.

In March 2006, the airport undertook a  expansion of Terminal 2, and the construction of an additional level of airline lounges above the terminal. In 2008 a further  expansion of Terminal 2 commenced, costing $330 million with completion in 2011. The works added 5 additional aerobridges on a new passenger concourse, and a new  outbound passenger security and customs processing zone.

In 2017, Melbourne Airport international passenger movements exceeded 10 million annual travelers.

Terminals

Melbourne Airport's terminals have 68 gates: 53 domestic and 15 international. There are five dedicated freighter parking positions on the Southern Freighter Apron. The current terminal numbering system was introduced in July 2005; they were previously known as Qantas Domestic, International, and South (formerly Ansett Domestic).

Terminal 1

Terminal 1 hosts domestic and regional services for Qantas Group airlines, Qantas and QantasLink (which is located to the northern end of the building). Departures are located on the first floor, while arrivals are located on the ground floor. The terminal has 16 parking bays served by aerobridges; 12 are served by single aerobridges whilst four are served by double aerobridges. There are another five non-aerobridge gates, which are used by QantasLink.

Opened with Melbourne Airport in 1970 for Trans Australia Airlines, the terminal passed to Qantas in 1992 when it acquired the airline. Work on improving the original terminal commenced in October 1997 and was completed in late 1999 at a cost of $50 million, featuring a second pier, stands for 9 additional aircraft, an extended access roadway and the expansion of the terminal.

Today, a wide range of shops and food outlets are situated at the end of the terminal near the entrance into Terminal 2. Qantas has a Qantas Club, Business Class and a chairman's lounge in the terminal.

Terminal 2

Terminal 2 handles all international, and limited domestic flights out of Melbourne Airport, and opened in 1970. The terminal has 20 gates with aerobridges. Cathay Pacific, Qantas (which includes two lounges in Terminal 2, a First lounge and a Business lounge/Qantas Club), Singapore Airlines, Air New Zealand and Emirates all operate airline lounges in the terminal.

The international terminal contains works by noted Australian Indigenous artists including Daisy Jugadai Napaltjarri and Gloria Petyarre.

A $330 million expansion programme for Terminal 2 was announced in 2007 and was completed in 2012. The objectives of this project include new lounges and retail facilities, a new satellite terminal, increased luggage capacity and a redesign of customs and security areas. A new satellite terminal features floor-to-ceiling windows offers views of the North-South runway. The new concourse includes three double-decker aerobridges which are gates 16, 18 and 20, each accommodating an A380 aircraft or two smaller aircraft and one single aerobridge. The baggage handling capacity was also increased, and two new baggage carousels were built to cater to increased A380 traffic.

Although described as a satellite terminal, the terminal building is connected by an above-ground corridor to Terminal 2. Departures take place on the lower deck (similar to the A380 boarding lounges currently in use at Gates 9 and 11), with arrivals streamed on to the first floor to connect with the current first floor arrivals deck.

Terminal 3

Terminal 3 opened with the airport as the Ansett Australia terminal, but is now owned by Melbourne Airport. Terminal 3 is home to Virgin Australia. It has eleven parking bays served by single aerobridges and eight parking bays not equipped with aerobridges.

An expansion of the terminal was approved in 1989 and completed in 1991 when a second pier was added by Ansett to the south for use by smaller regional airline Kendell, which Ansett owned. The terminal was used exclusively by the Ansett Group for all its domestic activities until its collapse in 2001. It was intended to be used by the "new Ansett", under ownership of Tesna; however, following the Tesna group's withdrawal of the purchase of Ansett in 2002, the terminal was sold back to Melbourne Airport by Ansett's administrators. As a result, Melbourne Airport undertook a major renovation and facelift of the terminal, following which Virgin Australia (then Virgin Blue) moved in from what was then called Domestic Express (now Terminal 4), and has since begun operating The Lounge in the terminal, using the former Ansett Australia Golden Wing Lounge area. Rex also operates an airline lounge in the terminal. The second pier of T3 was lost to the new T4, out of the ten gates they will be reclaiming three. While the others will be used by Tigerair Australia. Check-In facilities for Virgin Australia will still be in T3.

Terminal 4

Terminal 4 – originally called the Domestic Express or South Terminal – is dedicated to budget airlines and is the first facility of its kind at a conventional airport in Australia. It was originally constructed for Virgin Blue (Virgin Australia) and Impulse Airlines. Virgin Blue eventually moved into Terminal 3 following the demise of Ansett. A$5 million refit began in June 2007 along the lines of the budget terminal model at Singapore Changi Airport and Kuala Lumpur International Airport. Lower landing and airport handling fees are charged to airlines due to the basic facilities, lack of jet bridges, and fewer amenities and retail outlets compared to a conventional terminal. However, the terminal is located next to the main terminal building, unlike in Singapore and Kuala Lumpur. The terminal was rebuilt by Tiger Airways Australia, which has used it as its main hub since it operated its first domestic flight on 23 November 2007.

Jetstar confirmed its involvement in discussions with Melbourne Airport regarding the expansion of terminal facilities to accommodate for the growth of domestic low-cost services. The expansion of Terminal 4 includes infrastructure to accommodate Tiger Airways Australia and Jetstar Airways flights. The development cost hundreds of millions of dollars. In March 2012, airport officials T4 would break ground that October the same year T4 and they expected completion in July 2014, however they later pushed that date to late August 2015. The facility opened on 18 August 2015. Terminal 4 is currently used by Rex Airlines, Jetstar, Airnorth, formerly Tigerair Australia and new airline Bonza. In November 2015 Jetstar moved into T4. Three Gates are dedicated to Virgin Australia. Jetstar has triple the number of gates it had at T1.

Southern Freighter Apron
The Southern Freighter Apron has five dedicated freighter parking positions which host 21 dedicated freighter operations a week. In August 1997, the fifth freighter parking position and the apron was extended.

Other facilities
Melbourne Airport is served by four hotels. Work commenced on the six-story 280-room hotel in January 1999 and was completed in mid-2000. The hotel was originally a Hilton but was relaunched as the Parkroyal on 4 April 2011. Mantra Tullamarine opened in 2009,  from the terminal precinct.

Operations

Overview
Melbourne is the second busiest airport in Australia. The airport is curfew-free and operates 24 hours a day, although between 2 am and 4 am, freight aircraft are more prevalent than passenger flights. In 2004, the environmental management systems were accredited ISO 14001, the world's best practice standard, making it the first airport in Australia to receive such accreditation.

Runways
Two new runways are also planned: a  runway parallel to the current north–south runway and a  runway south of the current east–west runway. The current east west runway extension and new third runway were expected to cost $500–750 million with major construction originally set to begin around 2019 and be complete by 2022. However, in 2019 following an extensive consultation period, Melbourne Airport unexpectedly dropped plans for a new east-west runway in favour of constructing a new parallel north-south runway to the west of the airport, citing aircraft noise concerns for residents in nearby suburbs of Gladstone Park, Westmeadows, Attwood and Jacana. Although there is an additional 12–24 months of planning, Melbourne Airport Corporation anticipates the new north-south runway will be operational by 2025, with the potential to include the extension of the existing east-west runway. Traffic movement was expected to reach 248,000 per annum by 2017, and existing runway capacity is expected by 2023, necessitating a third runway.

On 5 June 2008, it was announced that the airport would install a Category III landing system, allowing planes to land in low visibility conditions, such as fog. This system was the first of its kind in Australia, and was commissioned March 2010 at a cost of $10 million.

Melbourne Airspace Control Centre
In addition to the onsite control tower, the airport is home to Melbourne Centre, an air traffic control facility that is responsible for the separation of aircraft in Australia's busiest flight information region (FIR), Melbourne FIR. Melbourne FIR monitors airspace over Victoria, Tasmania, southern New South Wales, most of South Australia, the southern half of Western Australia and airspace over the Indian and Southern Ocean. In total, the centre controls 6% of the world's airspace. The airport is also the home of the Canberra, Adelaide and Melbourne approach facilities, which provide control services to aircraft arriving and departing at those airports.

Airlines and destinations

Passenger

Cargo

Traffic and statistics

In 2016–17 Melbourne Airport recorded around 25 million domestic passenger movements and around 10 million international passenger movements. In that year there were 239,466 aircraft movements in total. Melbourne Airport was tipped to record 47 million passengers in the year to June 30, 2020, before the pandemic hit, but instead recorded 27.2 million as state and international borders were closed. Melbourne is the second busiest airport in Australia for passenger movements, behind Sydney and ahead of Brisbane.

^ Passenger service movements only (excludes freight).

Ground transport

Road

One freeway offramp runs directly into the airport grounds, and a second to the south serves freight transport, taxis, buses and airport staff. In June 2015, the Airport Drive extension was completed, creating a second major link to the airport. The link starts at the M80 Western Ring Road and provides direct access to Melrose Drive 1.5 kilometres from the terminal area. As of 2018 the Tullamarine Freeway is being widened.

Melbourne Airport has five car parks, all of which operate 24 hours a day, 7 days a week. The short-term, multi-level long-term, business and express carparks are covered, while the long-term parking is not. The main multi-level carpark in front of the terminal was built in the late 1990s, replacing the pre-existing ground-level car parking. It has been progressively expanded ever since.

Melbourne Airport recorded more than 2.2 million taxi movements in the year to 30 June 2017.

Public transport

Buses and shuttle services

The SkyBus operates express bus services from the airport to Southern Cross railway station (on the western boundary of the Melbourne central business district) and St Kilda. Shuttle services also operate between the airport and the Mornington Peninsula, making stops in St Kilda, Elsternwick, Brighton and Frankston. SkyBus current transports around 3.4 million passengers between the airport and Melbourne's CBD.

Metropolitan and regional public buses also operate to or via the airport. Routes 478, 479 & 482 operate to Airport West, via the route 59 tram terminus. Route 479 also operate to Sunbury railway station, connecting with Sunbury and Bendigo line trains. SmartBus route 901 was introduced in September 2010 as a frequent bus service. Route 901 connects to trains at Broadmeadows (Craigieburn, Seymour, Shepparton and Albury lines), Epping (Mernda line), Greensborough (Hurstbridge line) and Blackburn (Belgrave and Lilydale lines). V/Line operates timetabled regional coach services to Barham and Deniliquin via the airport.

There are nine other bus companies serving the airport, with services to Ballarat, Bendigo, Dandenong, Frankston, Mornington Peninsula, Geelong, Melbourne's suburbs, Shepparton and the Riverina. These provide alternatives to transfer onto other V/Line services.

Rail connection

The Andrews state government commenced construction on Melbourne Airport Rail (SRL Airport) in 2022 and the rail link is set to open by 2029. The 27 km link will run via Sunshine station in Melbourne's west into the central city via the under-construction Metro Tunnel. The link will connect to western regional rail services at Sunshine and to other services on the Metropolitan rail network at Sunshine, Footscray, and State Library and Town Hall in the CBD. The link will be the first direct rail connection to the Airport.

Constructing a rail link has been discussed in Victorian politics since Melbourne Airport opened. Connecting the Broadmeadows line (now the Craigieburn line) to the airport was debated in the 1960s under the Bolte state government, but with insufficient support in parliament, the rail project was abandoned in 1965.

In 2001, the Bracks State Government investigated the construction of a heavy rail link to the Airport under the Linking Victoria programme. Two options were considered; the first branched off the Craigieburn Suburban Line to the east, and the second branched off the Albion Goods Line, which passes close to the airport's boundary to the south. The second option was preferred. Market research concluded most passengers preferred travelling to the airport by taxi or car, and poor patronage of similar links in Sydney and Brisbane cast doubt on the viability of the project. This led to the project being deferred until at least 2012. On 21 July 2008, the Premier of Victoria reaffirmed the government's commitment to a rail link and said that it would be considered within three to five years. To maximise future development options, the airport lobbied for the on-grounds section of the railway to be underground.

In 2010, Martin Pakula of the Labor Party, newly appointed State Minister for Public Transport, announced that the rail link had been taken off the agenda with new freeway options being explored instead. A change of government at the 2010 Victorian State Election to renewed focus on the link, with a promise by the incoming Coalition government to undertake planning for its construction. Proposals in January 2013 to improve the bus service to the airport involving turning emergency lanes into bus lanes on the freeway and the Bolte Bridge and putting SkyBus on a myki fare, were challenged by CityLink operator Transurban, because it would limit its toll revenue, and by Melbourne Airport, because it would reduce its car parking profits.

On 13 March 2013, the Victorian Liberal government under then Premier, Denis Napthine, announced that the Melbourne Airport Rail Link (MARL) would be constructed around 2015/16 running from the CBD via Sunshine station and the Albion–Jacana railway line. This proposal was shelved after the Napthine Government lost office to the Labor Party at the 2014 state election.

After initially rejecting the project, the Andrews Government announced in May 2017 that it would spend $10 million along with the Turnbull Government's $30 million to devise a rail link planning study. On 23 November 2017, Premier Daniel Andrews told business groups that construction on a rail link between the airport and Melbourne's Southern Cross station via Sunshine station would begin construction within the next 10 years.

On 12 April 2018, then-Prime Minister Malcolm Turnbull pledged $5 billion in federal funding for a rail link between the Airport and the Melbourne CBD, provided the Victoria state government match the funding. On 22 July 2018, the state government announced that it would provide $5 billion to match federal government funding for the airport rail link. The Sunshine route was chosen, with Sunshine station to be upgraded for easier interchange for metropolitan and regional passengers onto Airport services and the link confirmed to run through the Metro Tunnel.

The business case was released in 2022 and it was announced that the Melbourne Airport station would be elevated. Melbourne Airport Corporation objected to the elevated station, arguing for it to be built underground.

Accidents and incidents
 On 29 May 2003, Qantas Flight 1737 from Melbourne to Launceston Airport was subjected to an attempted hijacking shortly after takeoff. The hijacker, a passenger named David Robinson, intended to fly the aircraft into the Walls of Jerusalem National Park, located in central Tasmania. The flight attendants and passengers successfully subdued and restrained the hijacker, and the aircraft returned to Melbourne.
 On 20 March 2009, Emirates Airline Flight 407, an Airbus A340-500, was taking off from Melbourne Airport on Runway 16 for a flight to Dubai International Airport and failed to become airborne in the normal distance. When the aircraft was nearing the end of the runway, the crew commanded nose-up sharply, causing its tail to scrape along the runway as it became airborne, during which smoke was observed in the cabin. The crew dumped fuel and returned to the airport. The damage caused to the aircraft was considered substantial. The aircraft damaged a strobe light at the end of the runway as well as an antenna on the localiser, which led to the ILS being out of service for some time causing some disruptions to the airport's operation.
 On 11 October 2022, a security breach occurred at the airport, with a Qantas spokesperson saying that "A passenger appears to have inadvertently passed from an unscreened area to a screened area of the airport in Melbourne". Australian Federal Police shut down a section of the airport, and ordered all passengers in the terminal be rescreened, including those already on planes waiting to take off.

Awards and accolades
Melbourne Airport has received numerous awards. The International Air Transport Association ranked Melbourne among the top five airports in the world in 1997 and 1998. In 2003, Melbourne received the IATA's Eagle Award for service and two National Tourism Awards for tourism services.

The airport has received recognition in other areas. It has won national and state tourism awards, and Singapore Airlines presented the airport with the Service Partner Award and Premier Business Partner Award in 2002 and 2004, respectively. In 2006, the airport won the Australian Construction Achievement Award for the runway widening project, dubbed "the most outstanding example of construction excellence for 2006". In 2012, Parkroyal Melbourne Airport was awarded for the best airport hotel in Australia/the Pacific by Skytrax. According to Skytrax World's Top 100 Airports List, Melbourne Airport has improved from ranked 43rd in 2012 to 27th in 2018.

See also
 City of Keilor – the former local government area of which Melbourne Airport was a part
 List of airports in Victoria
 Transport in Australia

Notes

References

External links

 

Airports in Victoria (Australia)
 
1970 establishments in Australia
Airports established in 1970
Transport in Melbourne
Landmarks in Melbourne
International airports in Australia
Buildings and structures in the City of Hume